Springbank School, founded in 1996, is an independent co-educational school in Kerikeri, Bay of Islands, New Zealand. The school caters for students aged Year 1-13 and is situated on 14ha of rural land near Kerikeri airport.

Springbank School follows the Cambridge International Examinations curriculum, and has received attention in the media for its academic, enterprise and community success.

References 

Educational institutions established in 1996
Schools in the Northland Region
Cambridge schools in New Zealand
1996 establishments in New Zealand